NGC 6755 is an open cluster of stars in the equatorial constellation of Aquila, positioned about 3° to the east of the star Delta Aquilae. It was discovered by the Anglo-German astronomer William Herschel on July 30, 1785. However, they probably do not form a binary cluster system since they have different ages and are too distant from each other.

This cluster has a Trumpler class of II2r with a visual magnitude of 7.5 and it spans an angular size . It has an estimated age of 250 million years, based on the main sequence turnoff. A total of 71 variable stars have been detected in the field of this cluster, of which 31 are eclipsing binaries, seven are pulsating variables, and 28 are most likely irregular variable red giants.

Gallery

References

External links
 
 

Open clusters
Aquila (constellation)
6755